Avriel Shull (born Avriel Joy Christie; February 9, 1931 – March 6, 1976) was an American architectural designer/builder and interior decorator whose career spanned from the 1950s until her death in 1976. She is best known for her mid-century modern architectural designs, which are especially unusual given the predominantly traditional tastes of mid-century Indiana. Most of Shull's projects were single-family homes around Hamilton and Marion counties in central Indiana, most notably the homes in Christie's Thornhurst Addition in Carmel, Indiana. Shull also designed a number of custom homes in Indianapolis's toniest suburbs, in other Indiana towns, and in other states. In the 1970s Shull began selling house plans in do-it-yourself home building periodicals, which were sold in the United States and Canada. Shull also designed apartment buildings and commercial/industrial properties. Her first major project outside of Indiana was a public library in Elkins, West Virginia. She also did designs for restaurants, including one in California and one in Carmel, Indiana.

Born Avriel Joy Christie in Hamilton County, Indiana, she graduated from Carmel High School and attended Butler University and the John Herron School of Art in Indianapolis, Indiana. She left school before completing her degree in 1948 to launch her own commercial art business. In 1951 she married Richard K. Shull, a well-known Indianapolis journalist who became a syndicated columnist and television critic. The couple had two daughters.

Shull, a self-taught artist without a degree in architecture (in fact with no college degree of any sort), devoted her artistic skills to building projects. A female builder/designer was unique for the time, but even more so was Shull's lack of formal architectural training. By 1954 Shull had designed and supervised the construction of her first project, the "Golden Unicorn", a modern-style home in Carmel, Indiana, named after the unicorn installed on an exterior wall. In 1955, Shull began her first large-scale construction project, a new suburban development on a large parcel of land just west of what is now downtown Carmel. Named Christie's Thornhurst Addition, the subdivision is unusual for its large concentration of Shull's strikingly-designed homes. In addition to the design work, Shull supervised construction, laying stone on many of the homes' exteriors herself; coordinated interior design; and assisted in furniture selection. Between 1956 and 1971 Shull designed and built twenty-one houses in Thornhurst.

Shull died in 1976 of complications from diabetes. Despite her early death, she left behind a raft of Avriel-designed homes. Christie's Thornhurst Addition was listed on the National Register of Historic Places in 2010 for its mid-century modern architecture and as the work of a master builder. The Avriel Shull architectural collection is housed at the Indiana Historical Society. Shull was a member of the National Association of Home Builders and the Builders Association of Greater Indianapolis.

Youth and education 
Born on February 9, 1931, Avriel Joy Christie was the daughter of Donald E. and Genevieve Christie of Carmel, Hamilton County, Indiana. At a young age the Christies recognized their daughter's talent for art. She became especially interested in clothing and interior design. After graduating from Carmel High School, she attended Butler University and the John Herron School of Art in Indianapolis, Indiana. She left school without earning a college degree and started her own commercial art business, Avriel Art Associates, in Indianapolis in 1948. Shull was a woman of "high energy and imagination". Within a few years, she had switched to architectural design.

Career 
Following her marriage to Indianapolis newspaperman Richard K. Shull in 1951, the young, self-employed artist shifted her focus to building design and construction projects. Even though she lacked formal architectural training, Shull launched Avriel, her architectural design and construction firm in Carmel, Indiana, and specialized in modern-style home designs. By 1954 she had designed and supervised the construction of her first home, a project that launched her career as an architectural designer and builder. The "Golden Unicorn", a modern-style home in Carmel, was named after the unicorn installed on an exterior wall.

Shull's first large-scale construction project was a suburban development on her parents' property, just west of what is now downtown Carmel, Indiana. In 1955 Shull's parents signed a certificate of survey for the first section of a new subdivision named Christie's Thornhurst Addition. The subdivision is unusual for the  exclusive use of Shull's modern-style home designs. Most post-World War II homes, especially in more conservative areas such as central Indiana, were revival-style or simple ranch homes. To attract homebuyers to Thornhurst, especially the growing number of U.S. military veterans and their families who were eligible for low-interest loans under the G.I. Bill, Shull designed modern homes to fit Federal Housing Administration guidelines. The FHA approved Shull's plans for the first three home designs for Thornhurst, which made them eligible for FHA financing.

Shull took a hands-on approach to developing the Thornhurst subdivision. Shull designed homes, supervised construction (often laying stone on home exteriors herself), coordinated interior design, and assisted in furniture selection. In 1957 the original plat was revised with a second addition. Between 1956 and 1971 Shull designed and built twenty-one homes in Thornhurst. Although Indianapolis architects, including Evans Woolen and others, designed and built modern-style homes, none of them tackled entire additions in the modern style like Shull did at Thornhurst. The project helped establish "Avriel" as a brand that represented modern architectural style. Soon, Shull began to expand her client list and portfolio with other projects.

While Shull's focus on modern-style homes set her apart from other designer/builders, she was certainly not alone. Notable architects such as Ludwig Mies van der Rohe and Joseph Eichler lead the way, influencing the work of others. Shull's designs shared some similarities with Eichler's California Contemporary homes: post-and-beam construction, which allowed for expansive, floor-to-ceiling windows and sliding glass doors; vertical siding; and decorative escutcheon plates on exterior doors. Shull's concept for a modern home design combined streamlined interiors with casual living spaces outdoors. Her interior sketches showed modern, informal living areas with easy-to-maintain furnishings.

Shull designed a few commercial and industrial properties, but most of her projects were single-family homes. In the 1960s and early 1970s, Shull-designed custom homes could be found in subdivisions around Hamilton and Marion counties, especially in upscale Indianapolis and Carmel suburban developments such as Springmill Estates, Williams Creek Heights, Somerset Hills, Devon Woods, Meridian Hills, Village Farms, Eden Estates and Williston Green. As Shull's reputation increased, so did the number of custom-built homes in other Indiana towns, such as Evansville, South Bend, and Brownsburg, and in other states. In the 1970s Shull began selling home design plans through Hudson Home Publications and other do-it-yourself home building periodicals, which were sold in the U.S. and Canada.

Shull's apartment designs include Somerset Lakes at 73rd Street and Keystone Avenue and the Ladywood Estates apartment community at the intersection of Emerson Way and Ladywood Drive in Indianapolis. Indianapolis attorney Frederick J. Capp hired her to design the Ladywood Estates complex in 1965. Shull's mid-century modern design for this project included post-and-beam construction, expansive panels of windows, stone masonry, and varied roof shapes.

Shull's other notable designs for commercial and industrial buildings the REA Terminal at English Avenue in Indianapolis and the Keystone Square Shopping Center in Carmel. She also designed the Woodland Springs Christian Church and the Woodland Springs Clubhouse in Carmel. Her first major project outside of Indiana was a design for the Elkins Public Library, in Elkins, West Virginia. She also did designs for restaurants, including the Totem Pole Restaurant in Carmel and one in San Bernardino, California.

Marriage and family 
On April 7, 1951, she married Richard K. Shull, an Indianapolis Times columnist. Richard Shull, who became Indianapolis's first TV critic, worked for the Indianapolis Times and later, the Indianapolis News. His witty, syndicated column, "Shull's Mailbag", ran in 260 newspapers. He was inducted into the Indiana Journalism Hall of Fame in 2005 and died in 2007. The couple, known to friends as "Ave and Arky ", had two daughters, Bambi (1960) and September (1966). Shull ran her design and construction business out of the home she designed for her family on a 40-acre tract of land north of Carmel. She died on March 6, 1976, of complications from diabetes. Shull was a Christian Scientist; a member of the Fifth Church of Christ, Scientist.

Contributions 
Despite her early death, Shull left behind a number of modern-style homes. The Thornhurst Addition, which includes twentyone of her designs, was listed on the National Register of Historic Places in 2010 and is noted for its mid-century modern architecture and the work of a master builder. Shull was a member of the National Association of Home Builders and the Builders Association of Greater Indianapolis. For more than twenty years, Shull designed and built modern single-family homes, apartment complexes, churches, shopping centers, libraries, and other commercial and industrial buildings that challenged traditional styles and reflected her artistic flair.

References

Further reading 
 Avriel Shull: A self-made architect focused on livable midcentury design

Sources 
 
 
 
 
 
 
 
 
 

1931 births
1976 deaths
Butler University alumni
Herron School of Art and Design alumni
Modernist architects
People from Carmel, Indiana
20th-century American architects
American women architects
20th-century American women